Circuit du Val de Vienne is a  motor racing circuit located in Le Vigeant, France. Opened in 1990, the circuit is operated by Les Deux Arbes, a group under the auspices of Jack Leconte and Jacques Nicolet.

Lap records 

The official race lap records at the Circuit du Val de Vienne are listed as:

Notes

References

External links

Val de Vienne
Sports venues in Vienne
Tourist attractions in Vienne
Everspeed